The Angu River is a river in the Brazilian state of Minas Gerais. It is a left bank tributary of the Rio Paraiba do Sul.
.

The source of the river is located in the municipality of Senador Cortes

and it passes through the municipalities of Santo Antônio do Aventureiro and Além Paraíba to its mouth on the Paraiba do Sul near the city of Volta Grande
.

References

Rivers of Minas Gerais